Fik Meijer (born 12 August 1942) is a Dutch historian and author.

Life 

He studied classics and ancient history at Leiden University and graduated in 1973.

He is an emeritus professor of ancient history at the University of Amsterdam.

Career 

His books have been translated into multiple languages.

His book about Gladiators was very well researched and has consistently received good reviews.

Bibliography 

Some of his notable books are:

References

External links
 

1942 births
Living people
20th-century Dutch historians
Leiden University alumni
21st-century Dutch historians
Academic staff of the University of Amsterdam